Scyphodon is a genus of ants belonging to the family Formicidae.

The species of this genus are found in Southeastern Asia.

Species
Species:
 Scyphodon anomalum Brues, 1925

References

Ants
Ant genera